The 1887–88 season was the fifth season Stoke took part in the FA Cup.

Season review
In the 1887–88 FA Cup Stoke advanced past local rivals Burslem Port Vale whom they beat 1–0 with a goal from George Lawton, Over Wanderers, Oswestry Town plus a fourth round Bye before losing 4–1 to West Bromwich Albion.

FA Cup

Squad statistics

References

Stoke City F.C. seasons
Stoke